Institute of Technology is a vocational school operating in California and Oregon. Several career training programs are offered at its four campus locations at Clovis, Modesto, Redding, and Salem, Oregon.

History 

Institute of Technology started as Fresno Institute of Technology. Later the name was shortened to the Institute of Technology. The school now operates three California campuses (Clovis, Modesto, Redding) and one in Salem, Oregon. The institute is operated by Modesto-based Select Education Group.

Training programs 

Four main program fields are taught: Culinary, Technical, Medical, and Business fields. Within each field, students are given the opportunity to specialize in specific areas. For example, they have the opportunity to become a Culinary Arts Specialist, Network Support Technician, Pharmacy Technician, Licensed Vocational Nurse, or Human Resource Administrator.

Accreditation 

Institute of Technology is accredited by the Accrediting Commission of Career Schools and Colleges (ACCSC).

The Salem campus is accredited by the Accrediting Council for Continuing Education and Training (ACCET).

References

External links 

 
 Clovis
 Modesto
 Redding
 Salem, Oregon

Universities and colleges in Fresno County, California
Universities and colleges in Placer County, California
Universities and colleges in Shasta County, California
Universities and colleges in Stanislaus County, California
Education in Modesto, California
Private universities and colleges in California